State Highway 249 (SH 249), also known depending on its location as West Mount Houston Road, the Tomball Parkway, Tomball Tollway, MCTRA 249 Tollway, or the Aggie Expressway, is a  generally north–south highway in Southeast Texas. The southern terminus is in North Houston at Interstate 45 (I-45). The current northern terminus of the highway is east of Navasota at SH 105.

Route description

West Mount Houston Road section 

The section of SH 249 along the east-west section between I-45 and West Montgomery is called West Mount Houston Road, a local arterial road. West Mount Houston Road, however, actually extends east past the intersection of SH 249 at I-45 to an intersection with Airline Drive.

Tomball Parkway section 
The section of SH 249 between West Montgomery Road and Spring Cypress Road is called Tomball Parkway. South of its intersection with Hollister Road, Tomball Parkway is a local arterial road, whereas north of it, it becomes a non-tolled freeway.

Tomball Tollway section

Phase I
The Tomball Tollway is three lanes in each direction that are used to bypass seven stoplights and will only accept electronic toll-tags (EZ Tag, TollTag and TxTag) as no cash payments will be allowed; the total cost of the toll for HCTRA's segment is $1.50 for two-axle vehicles, while the SH 249 frontage roads will remain free to all drivers. Construction of phase one began in fall 2013 and was completed on April 12, 2015.

Phase II
Phase two extends the tollway into Montgomery County from Business SH 249-B to Sentinel Oaks in Montgomery County north of Spring Creek. This $335 million project was overseen by the Harris and Montgomery County toll road authorities.  Construction on Phase 2 commenced in fall 2016 and was opened to traffic on December 19, 2019.

MCTRA 249 Tollway section
From Spring Creek to FM 1774 in Pinehurst, the tolled mainlanes of SH 249 will be maintained by the Montgomery County Toll Road Authority.  Signed as MCTRA 249 Tollway, the first section to open was between Spring Creek and Sentinel Oaks (coinciding with Phase two of the HCTRA segment) on December 19, 2019. Construction on the next segment of MCTRA 249 Tollway from Sentinel Oaks to FM 1774 commenced in spring 2018.  The next section of MCTRA 249 Tollway opened from Sentinel Oaks to Woodtrace Boulevard on March 26, 2020. The remaining MCTRA segment connecting to the TxDOT maintained section north of Woodtrace Boulevard opened on August 8, 2020. The total cost of the toll for MCTRA's segment is $1.25 for two-axle vehicles and, like HCTRA's Tomball Tollway, will only accept electronic toll-tags (EZ Tag, TollTag and TxTag).

Aggie Expressway section

Segment 1A 
From FM 1774 in Pinehurst to FM 1488 east of Magnolia, the toll road continues as SH 249 Toll, also known as the Aggie Expressway. The tolled mainlanes of Section 1A are maintained by TxDOT and were opened on August 8, 2020, with no tolls charged until December 2020.  Unlike the HCTRA and MCTRA sections of the toll road, TxDOT allows a pay-by-mail option for all users in addition to EZ Tag, TollTag and TxTag.

Segment 1B 
Another eight miles of the Aggie Expressway from FM 1488 up to FM 1774 north Todd Mission opened to traffic on March 26, 2021. The current cost to drive the entire TxDOT section is $2.28 for two-axle vehicles, which took effect on the day of the latest segment to open.

Segment 2 
The final segment of SH 249, Segment 2 of the Aggie Expressway began construction in late 2018 and was opened to all traffic on October 28, 2022. It stretches from FM 1774 near Todd Mission to SH 105 east of Navasota.

History
Originally a part of FM 149, the highway was given the designation of SH 249 in 1988. The highway's importance grew after Compaq (later purchased by Hewlett-Packard) moved its headquarters close to the intersection of SH 249 and Louetta Rd. In 2003, a portion of SH 249 in Tomball was renamed Business SH 249B from Hicks Road to Holderreith Road. This is because of bypass that bypasses Tomball on the west side of the city. In 2015, SH 249 was extended northwest 24.4 miles from FM 149 and FM 1774 to SH 105 near Stoneham. A section of SH 249 from Woodtrace Boulevard to FM 149 was renumbered as a southern extension of FM 1774 in December 2019. On June 25, 2020, the FM 1774 extension was modified so that it extended only over the frontage roads of SH 249 from FM 149 to Woodtrace Boulevard while the main lanes from Woodtrace Boulevard to FM 1774 and on to SH 105 retained the SH 249 designation. On August 8, 2020, the section of SH 249 from FM 1774 to FM 1488 was opened. On March 26, 2021, the section of SH 249 from FM 1488 to FM 1774 was opened.

Previously, SH 249 was designated on June 22, 1937 from then-SH 73 (now Interstate 10) near San Felipe north to the Brazos River. The route was redesignated on May 9, 1940, as Texas Spur 99. The route became part of Farm to Market Road 1458 on January 20, 1966.

Since the designation of SH 249, TxDOT had long-term plans to extend the highway to Grimes County. Continued growth in the Bryan/College Station, Conroe and northwest Houston regions have congested existing roadways, including SH 105 and FM 1774. Texas A&M University and businesses in the Bryan/College Station area would benefit from faster connections to Bush-Intercontinental Airport, the Port of Houston and the Texas Medical Center. A bypass of Magnolia, Texas was desirable because of the large traffic load every October due to the annual Renaissance fair. Decreased funding for road projects in recent years had stalled the extension of SH 249. However the rapid growth in the area has led to a renewed push in 2012 to build further segments.

Plans for the middle segments (Pinehurst-Todd Mission) and north segment (Todd Mission-Navasota) were revived by the Texas Department of Transportation in early 2013. TxDOT has formed a working group with local officials and stakeholders to discuss alternatives for the SH 249 corridor. The segment from Sentinel Oaks to FM 1774 in Pinehurst (maintained by MCTRA) opened in spring 2020. From FM 1774 in Pinehurst, north up to SH 105 in Grimes County, SH 249 was under the jurisdiction of TxDOT. The remaining portion of SH 249 in Montgomery County from FM 1488 to FM 1774 in Todd Mission was competed on March 26, 2021. In Grimes County, the north segment was constructed as a non-tolled two-lane freeway. Construction in Grimes County began in late 2018 and was completed in October 2022.

Popular culture
The country music group Eli Young Band references "Highway 249" in their 2008 single "Always the Love Songs." Several of the band members grew up in Tomball.

Major intersections

References

External links

State highways in Texas
Toll roads in Texas

Texas State Highway 249
Texas State Highway 249
Texas State Highway 249
Texas State Highway 249